Auchnacree is an estate in Angus, Scotland, five miles north of Forfar.

In 1921 the estate overseer, Mr Frank Rae, discovered what is now called the Auchnacree Hoard. This comprised two knives, three axeheads and an armlet, all in bronze, which are dated to the early Bronze Age. Some of the objects appear to have been deliberately broken which suggests a ritual deposit rather than a lost cache.

References

 Auchnacree Hoard at National Museums of Scotland / Scran

Bronze Age Scotland
Villages in Angus, Scotland
Archaeological sites in Angus, Scotland
1921 archaeological discoveries